Centroacinar cells are spindle-shaped cells in the exocrine pancreas. They represent an extension of the intercalated duct into each pancreatic acinus. These cells are commonly known as duct cells, and secrete an aqueous bicarbonate solution under stimulation by the hormone secretin. They also secrete mucin.

The intercalated ducts take the bicarbonate to intralobular ducts which become lobular ducts. These lobular ducts finally converge to form the main pancreatic duct.

See also 
List of human cell types derived from the germ layers

References

External links
  - "Pancreas"
  - "Liver, Gall Bladder, and Pancreas: pancreas, centroacinar cells"
 

Digestive system